Elizabeth Quay station may refer to:
 Elizabeth Quay bus station in Perth, Australia
 Elizabeth Quay railway station in Perth, Australia